Events in the year 2018 in Estonia.

Incumbents
 President: Kersti Kaljulaid
 Prime Minister: Jüri Ratas

Events

Deaths
16 February – Heli Lääts (born 1932), singer 
22 August – Tullio Ilomets (born 1921), chemist and science historian
23 October – Rein Põder (born 1943), writer
6 December – Pete Shelley (born 1955), British musician

See also
 2018 in Estonian football
 2018 in Estonian television

References

 
2010s in Estonia
Years of the 21st century in Estonia
Estonia
Estonia